The Pilgrims Society, founded on 16 July 1902 by Sir Harry Brittain KBE CMG, is a British-American society established, in the words of American diplomat Joseph Choate, 'to promote good-will, good-fellowship, and everlasting peace between the United States and Great Britain'.  It is not to be confused with the Pilgrim Society of Plymouth, Massachusetts.

Membership
Over the years it has boasted an elite membership of politicians, diplomats, businessmen, and writers who have included Henry Kissinger, Margaret Thatcher, Caspar Weinberger, Douglas Fairbanks Jr., Henry Luce, Lord Carrington, Alexander Haig, Paul Volcker, Thomas Kean, George Shultz, and Walter Cronkite among many others.  Members of the immediate Royal Family, United States secretaries of state and United States ambassadors to the Court of St. James's are customarily admitted ex officio to membership in the Society.

Activities
The Society is notable for holding dinners to welcome into office each successive U.S. Ambassador to the United Kingdom.  The patron of the society is King Charles III. 

Prime Minister Winston Churchill delivered a speech to the Society on March 18, 1941.

History
The first informal meeting of the Pilgrims of Great Britain included General Joseph Wheeler, Colonel (later General Sir) Bryan Mahon, the Hon Charles Rolls and Harry Brittain.

The first meeting of the Pilgrims of the United States was at the Waldorf Astoria Hotel in New York on 13 January 1903.

The Pilgrims of Great Britain and the Pilgrims of the United States have reciprocal membership.

Executive Committee members, as of 2020, are:
 Marshal of the Royal Air Force the Lord Stirrup KG GCB AFC (President)
 Mrs Diane Simpson (Chairman)
 Sir Stephen Wright KCMG (Honorary Secretary)
 Mr Richard Reid (Honorary Treasurer)
 Mr Abdul Bhanji
 Sir Peter Bottomley MP
 Mr Peter Cadbury
 Professor Stephen J. Challacombe
 Mr Piers Coleman
 Mr Paul Dimond CMG
 Mr Tristan Elbrick
 Mrs Kweilen Hatleskog
 Mrs Valerie Humphrey
 Ms Yael Lempert, Deputy Chief of Mission, American Embassy, London
 Sir David Newbigging OBE
 Sir Bryan Nicholson GBE
 Mr Mark Seligman
 Air Marshal Sir David Walker KCVO OBE
 Ms Xenia Wickett
 Admiral Sir George Michael Zambellas, GCB, DSC, ADC, DL, FRAeS

Mrs Amy Thompson is the Executive Secretary, successor to Mrs Tessa Wells

Notable members
Queen Elizabeth II
King Charles III
Senator Nelson W. Aldrich
Ambassador Winthrop W. Aldrich
Philanthropist John Nicholas Brown II
Columbia University President Nicholas Murray Butler
NATO Secretary General Lord Carrington
Ambassador John W. Davis
Vice President Charles G. Dawes
Admiral William J. Crowe
Senator Chauncey Depew
CIA Director Allen W. Dulles
Secretary of State John Foster Dulles
Ambassador James W. Gerard
General Alexander Haig
Ambassador to the United States Edward Wood, 1st Earl of Halifax
Ambassador W. Averell Harriman
Ambassador Joseph P. Kennedy
Ambassador Henry R. Luce
Financier John Pierpont Morgan Sr.
Congressman Ogden Reid
Ambassador Whitelaw Reid
Publisher Ogden Mills Reid
Publisher Whitelaw Reid (journalist)
Supreme Court Justice Sandra Day O'Connor
Secretary of State Henry Kissinger
Attorney General Elliot Richardson
General of the Army George C. Marshall
Secretary of the Treasury Andrew W. Mellon
Oil Refiner John D. Rockefeller
Banker David Rockefeller
Secretary of State Elihu Root
Banker Jacob Schiff
Ambassador John Hay Whitney
Theologian Robin Ward

References

Further reading

External links

Dining clubs
Organizations established in 1902